In comedy, a visual gag or sight gag is anything which conveys its humour visually, often without words being used at all. The gag may involve a physical impossibility or an unexpected occurrence. The humor is caused by alternative interpretations of the goings-on. Visual gags are used in magic, plays, and acting on television or movies.

Types
The most common type of visual gag is based on multiple interpretations of a series of events. This type is used in the 1935 Alfred Hitchcock film The 39 Steps. Lead actor Robert Donat was kidnapping actress Madeleine Carroll and they were handcuffed. When they checked into an inn, the innkeeper assumed that they were passionate lovers because of the handcuffs. The film used dialogue that could be interpreted both ways.

Another visual gag is a switched image, often at the beginning of a film. A subsequent view of the scene shows something not viewed before. Switched movement may be the gag, such as Charlie Chaplin in The Pawnshop. Chaplin fights with his coworker and aims to punch at him once. Their boss walks in mid-swing and Chaplin changes the motion to act like he was dropping to his knees to scrub the floor. 

Noel Carroll established the most influential taxonomy of sight gags, breaking down the varieties into six types, two of which are enumerated below.

Mutual Interference: The audience is fully aware of the on-screen situation, but a character comically misunderstands

Mimed Metaphor: A variety of virtual simile an object may be treated as if it is a different object or be used in an unconventional way, such as acting like a doughnut is a barbell or using a tuba as an umbrella holder.

History
There are numerous examples in cinema history of directors who based most of the humor in their films on visual gags, even to the point of using no or minimal dialogue. Visual gags began in live theater. The first known use of a visual gag in a film was in the Lumière brothers' 1895 short, L'Arroseur Arrosé ("The Waterer Watered"), in which a gardener watering his plants becomes the subject of a boy's prank. An early pioneer in visual gags was Georges Méliès. The filmmaker experimented with techniques in the then-new film media creating techniques to trick viewers.

Vaudeville actors often used gags in their routines. A classic vaudeville visual gag was for two actors to mirror each other's actions around a prop.  Visual gags were continued into silent films and are considered a hallmark of the genre. In silent films, the actors in the mirror bit performed in silence with no music playing.  Comedians including Charlie Chaplin, Buster Keaton, Harold Lloyd and the Marx Brothers often used visual humour because the technology used to record voices in film (and play it back in a synchronized presentation) did not yet exist. Often the differences between people are part of the comic duos, especially thin and fat actors are used such as Abbott and Costello and Laurel and Hardy.

The New York Times cites the fourth Gilligan's Island episode, "Goodnight, Sweet Skipper", as a classic American sight gag. The castaways were trying to contact civilization with a radio. In the episode, Skipper can recall only how he converted the radio into a transmitter in World War II when he was sleepwalking. After Skipper was unsuccessful, Gilligan got it to work by pounding on the radio; he used it to briefly contact a pilot flying overhead. Gilligan retrieved Skipper and demonstrated how he pounded on the radio, causing the guts of the radio to fall out. Their rescue was foiled.

See also
Joke
Wile E. Coyote and the Road Runner

References

Humour